Moolpa is a small rural community in the southwest part of the Riverina in New South Wales, Australia, and is named after a nearby sheep and wheat station.  It is situated about 13 kilometres southwest of Pereketen and 34 kilometres northwest of Moulamein by road.

Notes and references

Towns in the Riverina
Towns in New South Wales